Leonid Nikolaevich Lazarev (Russian: Леонид Николаевич Лазарев) was a Russian photographer and photojournalist.

Art Biography 

1957 - Won the second prize in the Moscow Festival of Youth and Students photo contest.

1957-1960 - Took part in a series of photo exhibitions called "Our Youth".

1958-1963 - Worked as a photojournalist in a "Soviet Woman" magazine.

1960 - Prize-winner of a "Soviet Woman" magazine.

1961 - Prize-winner of an all-USSR photo exhibition.

1961 - Prize-winner of an all-USSR photo exhibition for the 2nd time.

1964 - Worked as a photojournalist in a "Krugozor" magazine.

1972 – Graduated from the Journalistic Mastery Institute.

1974 - Prize-winner of an international contest by the "New Time" magazine.

1977 - Graduated from the Gerasimov Institute of Cinematography, cameraman faculty.

1985 - Prize-winner of an all-USSR "40 years of Great Victory" photo exhibition.

1999 - Awarded with a Kodak-Master title.

2008 - Personal photo exhibition in a "Photo Soyuz" gallery.

2010 - Personal photo exhibition in Orens Anz art gallery in New York, USA.

2010 - Sold works to Tretyakov Gallery.

2011 - A photo exhibition of Leonid Lazarev in the U.S. Congress. The opening was attended by: Dan Russell, Deputy assistant Secretary of state for Europe and Eurasia, Konstantin Kosachev — Chairman, State Duma Committee on international Affairs, curator of the exhibition - Natalia Kolodzei — Director of the Kolodzie Art Foundation.

2013 — Russian Museum exhibited Lazarev's photographs, from 05.09.2013, No. 2459/2.

2013 — Opening of "Penza arts international-2013" in The Penza Savitsky Art Gallery. Author's project "Generation".

2014 — Exhibition in the style of "Visionism" at the international exhibition "Penza Art International» in The Penza Savitsky Art Gallery.

2014 — The art gallery of the University of Arizona in the United States presented 18 photographs by L. Lazarev.

2015 — The Oscar Niemeyer Museum (Brazil) presented 19 photographs by L. Lazarev.
 
2016 — State Central Cinema Museum (Moscow) was replenished with 5 photographs by L. Lazarev, from 12.03.2015, No. 199.

2016, 21 March — the Opening of a personal exhibition of L. N. Lazarev at Columbia University in the United States.

2016 — The Museum of Moscow received 47 photographs by L. N. Lazarev, from 18.11.2016 No. 90.

2016 — Lazarev created a bronze sculpture called "Photographer". The sculpture was acquired by The State Historical and Memorial Museum-Reserve «Homeland of VI Lenin ». Act PP-30/16.

Photographic publications in press 
 1958–1963 – Soviet Woman magazine – 110 published works.
 1962 – Photography Yearbook - 1962 (edited by Nornam Hall, GB).
 1964–1993 – Krugozor and Kolobok magazines - 720 published works.
 1986 – Set of large format postcards "USSR Malyi Theater"
 1988 – Set of large format postcards "Moscow State Academic Children's Theater by the Name of N.I Satz"
 2003 – History of Russian Customs - illustrated book.
 2004 – Moscow in races – illustrated encyclopedic atlas.
 2007 – History of Moscow in XII - XX centuries - illustrated book.
 2007 –   "Photo 60-70" - book series "Anthology of Russian Photography of the XX century".
 2008 - Selected works - author's catalogue of L. N. Lazarev. Publisher: I. Gorshkov.
 2009 - "Vishva-VDNKh-VVC" - jubilee illustrated edition (4 books).
 2009 - "Moscow - Waiting for the Future" - author's catalogue of L. N. Lazarev.
 2010 - "Icons 1960-1980".
 2013 — The seven-volume multimedia edition of Rasul Gamzatov's work, with photo illustrations by Leonid Lazarev. Publisher: The Russian Book Union.
 2014 — «I live twice» - Leonid Lazarev's book of the authorial stories. Publishing center of Ulyanovsk State University.
 2015 — A book dedicated to the 2000th anniversary of Der bent. Filming Staged by Leonid Lazarev.
 2015 — «No powder and no paint», photobook by Leonid Lazarev. "Planeta" publishing house (according to the publishing program of the Moscow Government).
 2017 — «Bullet for Takamura». Short stories by L. Lazarev. Publishing House "Alfa-Design".
2021 - Natalia Kolodzie; Road to the Stars: Recollections of the Photographer Leonid Lazarev about 14 April 1961. Leonardo 2021; 54 (1): 8–11.

Sources 
Lumiere's photogallery

External links
 Official site
 Gallery of works
 Anthology of Russian photography of the 20th century
 Leonid Lazarev's book "Selected works" (2008) 

1937 births
Living people
Gerasimov Institute of Cinematography alumni
Russian photojournalists
Russian photographers
Soviet journalists
Russian male journalists
Soviet photographers
Writers from Moscow